Thomas or Tom McMillen may refer to:
Thomas Richard McMillen or Thomas Haden Church (born 1960),  American actor, director, and writer
Thomas Roberts McMillen (1916–2002), U.S. District Judge
Tom McMillen (born 1952), American former politician and basketball player

See also
Thomas McMillan (disambiguation)
Tom McMillin (2000s–2010s), Michigan politician